The AGS JH21C was the first Formula One car used by the French AGS team. It was designed by Christian Vanderpleyn and Michel Costa and entered into two races of the 1986 Formula One season, in Italy and Portugal, driven by Italian Ivan Capelli.

The single JH21C was built around a 1983 Renault RE40 monocoque that had been acquired by team owner Henri Julien. Its chassis number was 031. It was fitted with a Motori Moderni V6 turbocharged engine and Pirelli tyres, and painted in the white livery of the team's main sponsor El Charro, an Italian fashion company.

Before the car made its Grand Prix debut, it was tested at Paul Ricard by Didier Pironi, driving an F1 car for the first time since his leg-breaking crash at Hockenheim in 1982. However, Pironi saw this test as a one-off and thus did not compete for the race seat with Capelli.

In both races the car was entered into, Capelli qualified 25th and retired - suffering a puncture at Monza after 31 laps, and a gearbox failure at Estoril after six laps.

The car is now on display at the Manoir de l'Automobile in the commune of Lohéac, Brittany.

Complete Formula One results

(key)

References

1986 Formula One season cars
AGS Formula One cars